William John Mumm  (26 March 1922 – 11 December 1993) was a New Zealand rugby union player. A prop, Mumm represented Buller at a provincial level. He was a member of the New Zealand national side, the All Blacks, in 1949, playing one test match against Australia.

He later served as chairman of the Buller County Council and was appointed an Officer of the Order of the British Empire in the 1990 Queen's Birthday Honours, for services to local government.

References

1922 births
1993 deaths
New Zealand people of German descent
New Zealand rugby union players
New Zealand international rugby union players
Buller rugby union players
Rugby union props
Mayors of places in the West Coast, New Zealand
New Zealand Officers of the Order of the British Empire
20th-century New Zealand politicians
New Zealand justices of the peace